Tir Planitia is a large basin on the planet Mercury. The name Tir (تیر) is the Persian word for "Mercury".

The crater Fet is near the center of Tir Planitia.  Hovnatanian crater is southwest of Fet.  The craters Amru Al-Qays and Nureyev are in northern Tir Planitia.

References 

Surface features of Mercury